The 1947 Ohio Bobcats football team was an American football team that represented Ohio University in the Mid-American Conference (MAC) during the 1947 college football season. In their first season under head coach Harold Wise, the Bobcats compiled a 3–5–1 record (1–3 against MAC opponents), finished in fourth place in the MAC, and were outscored by all opponents by a combined total of 116 to 80. Offensive guard Ed Zednik was selected as a first-team All-MAC player.  They played their home games in Peden Stadium in Athens, Ohio.

Schedule

References

Ohio
Ohio Bobcats football seasons
Ohio Bobcats football